{{Infobox company
| name             = Air Products and Chemicals, Inc
| logo             = Logo Air Products.svg
| type             = Public company
| traded_as        = 
| founded          =  in Detroit, Michigan, U.S.
| founder          = Leonard P. Pool
| area_served      = Worldwide
| location         = 
| key_people       = Seifi Ghasemi (CEO),(chairman) and (president)
| industry         = Industrial gas, chemicals
| revenue          =   (2020)
| operating_income =   (2020)
| net_income       =   (2020)
| assets           =   (2020)
| equity           =   (2020)
| num_employees    =  19,275 (2020)
| website          = 
| footnotes        = 
}}Air Products and Chemicals, Inc.' is an American international corporation whose principal business is selling gases and chemicals for industrial uses. Air Products' headquarters is in Allentown, Pennsylvania, in the Lehigh Valley region of Pennsylvania. 

Air Products is the tenth largest employer in Lehigh County, Pennsylvania.

Products
Air Products serves customers in technology, energy, healthcare, food and industrial markets worldwide with atmospheric industrial gases (mainly oxygen, nitrogen, argon, hydrogen and carbon dioxide), process and specialty gases, performance materials and chemical intermediates.

Air Products produces  refinery hydrogen, natural gas liquefaction (LNG) technology and equipment, epoxy additives, gas cabinets, advanced coatings and adhesives.

Air Products provided the liquid hydrogen and liquid oxygen fuel for the Space Shuttle External Tank. Air Products has had a working relationship with NASA for 50 years and has supplied the liquid hydrogen used for every Space Shuttle launch and the Mercury and Apollo missions.

In 2013, Air Products' high purity BIP (built-in purifier) argon was used to determine a more accurate value for the Boltzmann Constant.

On September 17, 2015, Air Products announced its intent to spin off its Materials Technologies business. This new stand alone company was named Versum Materials. The spinoff was competed on October 3, 2016. Versum was later acquired by pharmaceutical company Merck.

In January 2017 Air Products completed the sale of its Performance Materials division to Evonik,  leaving the company focused on its industrial gases business.

Environmental record
In 2010, Air Products was awarded the Rushlight Hydrogen and Fuel Cells industry award for the Series 10 hydrogen fuelling station. The Rushlight Awards celebrate the leading environmental technologies and innovations by organizations throughout the UK and Ireland. The purpose is to promote what is happening in the world of hydrogen and fuel cells to the public and enable further development and funding to be granted toward reducing carbon emissions.

On January 15, 2004, Air Products (NYSE: APD) was named a Maplecroft Climate Innovation Indexes (CIIs) Leader, ranking 17th out of the 300 largest US companies evaluated for their climate-related innovation and carbon management programs. Air Products is currently working on several preeminent carbon capture and storage demonstration projects around the world.

Air Products was included on the Dow Jones Sustainability North America Index as one of the best performing sustainable companies for 2008/11.  Only the top 20 percent of the 600 largest companies largest North American companies are selected for the DJSI North America Index.

In 2001, Air Products Received an Award of Merit from the WateReuse Association for Outstanding Water Conservation Efforts for conserving  of drinking water annually by converting to recycled water for the cooling process at the Santa Clara, California, manufacturing facility. The award was presented during the 25th Annual WateReuse Symposium. WRA recognizes projects that have advanced the acceptance of water reuse through education, sound science, and technology using reclamation, recycling, reuse, or desalination for the benefit of the public and the environment.

Corporate responsibility
On March 4, 2010, Corporate Responsibility'' magazine named Air Products to its 100 Best Corporate Citizens List.

Air Products initially refused to cease operations in Russia in response to the 2022 invasion of Ukraine and the international sanctions subsequently levied against Russia.  However, according to Yale School of Management, the company reversed its position and has since divested its interests in Russia.

References

External links 

Chemical companies of the United States
Companies listed on the New York Stock Exchange
Manufacturing companies based in Pennsylvania
Companies based in Lehigh County, Pennsylvania
Chemical companies established in 1940
1940 establishments in Michigan
Industrial gases
American companies established in 1940